A Soviet citizen may refer to:
 An umbrella term for a citizen, or former citizen, of any member state of the Soviet Union (Soviet people)
 The ideal Soviet citizen, e.g. New Soviet man or Homo Sovieticus
 A believer in the modern-day Union of Slavic Forces of Russia pseudo-legal conspiracy theory